Tskaltsitela Gorge Natural Monument is a river gorge in western Georgia, in Tkibuli and Terjola municipalities. Historical and geographical name of this area of Georgia — Okriba. The main river in Okriba is river Tskaltsitela
, also spelled Tsqal-Tsitela. The river got it name because of reddish color of water: Tsqal means water and Tsitela means red in Georgian. Water acquires it color by washing clays containing iron rust. 
Tskaltsitela Gorge Natural Monument is stretch of Tskaltsitela river canyon approximately from Gelati Monastery Bridge all the way to Godagani Bridge at elevation of 130–200 meters above sea level.

Geography 
River Tskaltsitela rises from the south slopes of Nakerala range, it crosses the whole territory of Okriba till it merges with Kvirila River.
River source is located at the Nakerala Racha mountain ridge at 1080 m above sea level.  River Tskaltsitela length is 49 km, basin area 221 km². The main tributary is the river Chala. Nourishes mainly rain water. Floods are characteristic throughout the year. Average annual expenditures  7.56 m³/s. River Tskaltsitela bordered city of Kutaisi from the east.

Geology 
Tskaltsitela ravine is cutting into bedrock of carbonate formation of the Jurassic depositional age mostly represented by dolomites and dolomitized limestones. They belong to the lowest stage of the Cretaceous system and are called Neocomian sediments.
Lithologically, these sediments are crystal limestones and on occasion dolomites. In small areas sediments of Cenomanian age are found as well.  Lithologically, these sediments are limestones, marls, glauconitic sandstones and rarely clays and conglomerates.

In the vicinity of  Tskaltsitela river there are many natural quarries with chalcedony, barite, quartz sand, marble, basalt, agate, fireproof clays used for cement production, teshenit and other minerals. Coal mining has been under way in the vicinity of Tkibuli since the mid-19th century. But archeological excavations show that ore was mined here as early as 2nd millennium BC.

Flora 
Tsaltsitela canyon has beautifully preserved Euxine-Colchic deciduous forests.
Many medicinal plants  can be  found  in the Tskaltsitela ravine, such as common yew (Taxus baccata), Imeretian hazelnut (Corylus imeretica), celandine (Cheli donium  majus),  
black hawthorn (Crataegus  pentagina),  red hawthorn (Crataegus microphylla),   Dorycnium  graecum, shamrock (Oxalis acetocella), Persian berry or alder buckthorn (Frangula alnus), dwarf mallow (Malva  neglecta), rockrose (Cistus salviifolius) and Lemon balm (Melissa officinalis). Many are rare endemic species of Georgia and can be found on calcareous ecotopes of Tsaltsitela gorge in proximity of Gelati monastery.

Fauna 
River has a rich variety of fish species: trout, Bulatmai barbell (Barbus capito carpito), Terek barbel (Barbus ciscaucasicus), Luciobarbus mursa, European chub (Squalius cephalus), Colchic nase (Chondrostoma colchicum), Caspian shamaya (Alburnus chalcoides) and others. Banks of the river are inhabited by  nutria (Myocastor coypus). During the winter river is home to waterfowl birds. A variety of mammals also live here — golden jackal (Canis aureus), red fox (Vulpes vulpes) and European badger (Meles meles).

Cultural history 

Tskaltsitela gorge is home for a number of monuments of historical and cultural interest: Gelati Monastery Complex, Motsameta Monastery of Saint Martyrs and Constantine Monastery.
In 1757 the famous Battle of Khresili was conducted here.
According to the legend, the name of the tskaltsitela (tszulitela) was given to gorge after the Battle of Khresili, because the blood of fallen warriors painted river rocks in red.

Tourism and resorts 
There are some important resort areas on the territory of Okriba in area close to Tskaltsitela Gorge Natural Monument, including Satsire — a medical resort for children with allergies, bronchitis, pneumonia, inherent heart disease and bronchial asthma. Balneotherapy at resort includes application of nitric, slightly sulfide, hydro-carbonate, magnesium-calcium containing mineral waters.

See also 
Motsameta monastery
Tskaltsitela
List of mammals of Georgia (country)

References

Natural monuments of Georgia (country)
Canyons and gorges of Georgia (country)
Geography of Imereti
Protected areas established in 2007
2007 establishments in Georgia (country)